Otto Pesonen (9 September 1868, Heinävesi – 21 January 1936) was a Finnish farmer and politician. He belonged to the Young Finnish Party until 1918 and to the National Progressive Party thereafter. Pesonen served as a Member of the Diet of Finland from 1905 to 1906 and as a Member of the Parliament of Finland from 1909 to 1910, from 1916 to 1917 and again for a short time from February to March 1919.

References

1868 births
1936 deaths
People from Heinävesi
People from Mikkeli Province (Grand Duchy of Finland)
Young Finnish Party politicians
National Progressive Party (Finland) politicians
Members of the Diet of Finland
Members of the Parliament of Finland (1909–10)
Members of the Parliament of Finland (1916–17)
Members of the Parliament of Finland (1917–19)